Dog Soldiers is a 2002 British action horror film written, directed and edited by Neil Marshall, in his directorial debut, and starring Sean Pertwee, Kevin McKidd, Emma Cleasby and Liam Cunningham.

The film received positive reviews and launched the career of director Neil Marshall. Sequels were planned but did not happen.

Plot
A couple goes camping in the Scottish Highlands. The woman gives the man a silver letter opener as a present; shortly afterward they are killed in their tent by unseen assailants. Meanwhile, a soldier named Cooper runs through a forest in North Wales. He attacks his pursuers, but is overwhelmed and wrestled to the ground. It is revealed that Cooper is trying to join a special forces unit but fails when he refuses to shoot a dog in cold blood. He is returned to his unit by Captain Richard Ryan.

Four weeks later, a squad of six British soldiers, including Cooper, are dropped into a remote area of the Scottish Highlands to carry out a training exercise against a Special Air Service unit. The following morning, they find the SAS unit's savaged remains. A badly wounded Captain Ryan, the only survivor, makes cryptic references to what attacked them. The troops retreat when unseen assailants begin pursuing them.

While retreating, Corporal Bruce is impaled by a tree branch, which kills him, and Sergeant Wells is attacked. He is rescued by Cooper and carried to a rural roadside where the group meets Megan, a zoologist who takes them to a lonely house belonging to an unknown family. Soldiers Wells, Cooper, Spoon, Joe, and Terry remain.

As darkness falls, the house is surrounded by attackers who are revealed to be werewolves. The survivors try to get in the Land Rover but find it has been destroyed by the werewolves. The soldiers maintain a desperate defence against the creatures, believing that if they can make it to sunrise, the werewolves will revert to human form.

Cooper and Megan treat Wells' wounds. After Terry is abducted and their ammunition runs short, they realize they will not be able to hold out and decide to try to escape. Spoon creates a diversion while Joe steals a Land Rover from the garage. Joe drives up to the house door, but is then killed by a werewolf that was hiding in the back seat.

Under interrogation, Ryan reveals that he was sent on a government mission to capture a live werewolf for study and exploitation as a weapon; Cooper's squad was supposed to be the bait, and considered expendable. An enraged Wells and Cooper attempt to kill Ryan, but he transforms into a werewolf and escapes into the forest. It is revealed that the Uath family, the owners of the house, are the werewolves.

The soldiers try blowing up the barn - where Megan told them the werewolves must be hiding - using the Land Rover and petrol to create a bomb. Once the barn has been destroyed, Megan reveals that not only were there no werewolves in the barn, but she is part of the Uath family and a werewolf as well. She also reveals that she unlocked the back door to the house, allowing the other werewolves to get inside. Before she fully transforms, Wells shoots her in the head. He and Cooper run upstairs, while Spoon fights a werewolf in the kitchen. Using his surroundings to his advantage, he gains the upper hand, but is eventually killed when a second werewolf intervenes.

Wells and Cooper shoot through the floor upstairs to elude the werewolves and drop into the kitchen, where they find Spoon's remains. As he begins to transform into a werewolf, Wells orders Cooper to take shelter in the cellar and gives him a roll of photographic film (which was in a flash camera used to stun the werewolves) to prove what has happened. The werewolves break into the kitchen and confront Wells as he cuts a gas line and blows up the house, killing the werewolves and sacrificing himself.

As the sun rises, Cooper attempts to leave, but the werewolf Ryan confronts him. After a brutal fight, Cooper stabs Ryan in the chest with the silver letter opener, weakening him enough to allow Cooper to shoot him in the head. Cooper, along with Megan's Border Collie Sam, emerges from the cellar. Cooper's story, with photographs, is shown reported only in a sensationalist tabloid newspaper with title "Werewolves ate my platoon!", under the results of the England vs. Germany football match.

Cast
 Sean Pertwee as Sergeant Harry G. Wells
 Kevin McKidd as Private Lawrence Cooper
 Emma Cleasby as Megan
 Liam Cunningham as Captain Richard Ryan
 Darren Morfitt as Private Phil "Spoon" Witherspoon
 Chris Robson as Private Joe Kirkley
 Leslie Simpson as Private Terry Milburn
 Thomas Lockyer as Corporal Bruce Campbell
 Craig Conway as Male Camper
 Tina Landini as Female Camper

Production

Development
In 1995, director Neil Marshall pitched to co-producer Keith Bell his idea of a low-budget soldiers vs. werewolves film. The filmmakers were introduced to the Victor Film Company as a sales agent, who introduced them to producer Christopher Figg. The project was later taken to AFM, where producer David E. Allen became interested in the project after seeing artwork and the script.

Production designer Simon Bowles created models of the house for Marshall to plan and structure where to set up cameras and where characters would run or climb onto the next set. For the exterior set of the house, only the front portion was built early on and is the only part used in the film.

Dog Soldiers was produced by the Kismet Entertainment Group, the Noel Gay Motion Picture Company, the Victor Film Company, and the Carousel Picture Company with the support of the Luxembourg Film Fund. In addition to the credits in the infobox, the costume designer is Uli Simon, the casting directors are Jeremy Zimmerman and Andrea Clarke, the special makeup, animatronic and digital visual effects are by the company Image FX, and the physical-effects supervisor and stunt coordinator is Harry Wiessenhaan.

In the United States, the film premiered as a Sci-Fi Pictures telefilm on the Sci-Fi Channel.

The film contains homages to H. G. Wells as well as the films The Evil Dead, Zulu, Aliens, The Matrix and Star Trek II: The Wrath of Khan.

Writing
Marshall wrote the first draft in 1996. It took six years to refine the script and acquire financing. Marshall wanted the focus to be on the soldiers, with the creatures being an enemy that happens to be werewolves. Marshall wanted to avoid cliches about werewolf curses or "how awful it is to be a werewolf", which Marshall felt was a trope exhaustingly used in many werewolf films.

Filming
Principal photography was originally scouted and planned to commence in the Isle of Man due to its tax rebates but the idea fell through. Manitoba was later considered as a filming location due to tax reasons but the idea collapsed as well. The film was shot in Luxembourg due to tax deals and having access to crew and student facilities provided by a company based in Luxembourg. Snow affected the set occasionally, which delayed filming schedules.

Reception

On Rotten Tomatoes, the film has an approval rating of 80%, based on 41 reviews, and an average rating of 7.1/10. The site's consensus reads, "Frightening, funny, and packed with action, Dog Soldiers is well worth checking out for genre fans -- and marks writer-director Neil Marshall as a talent to keep an eye on."

Taste of Cinema writer David Harkin states that "Dog Soldiers ditches the drama of the original Wolfman of the 1940s and pushes Dog Soldiers into Aliens territory as seven-foot lycanthropes besiege a tiny cottage while macho soldiers fight for their lives".

Jamie Russell of the BBC gave it 4 out of 5 and called it "A rip-roaring comedy action fest that'll put hairs on your chest."
Empire magazine gave it 4 out of 5. 
Reviewing the 2020 rerelease the Guardian gave it 3 out of 5 and note that despite the limitations of the film the talent shown by Marshall in his debut feature that "You can easily draw a clear line through this to his later work". They conclude that "Dog Soldiers has aged pretty well."

Awards
In 2002, the film won the Brussels International Festival of Fantasy Film's Golden Raven, the festival's top award, as well as the audience prize, the Pegasus.

Home media
Dog Soldiers was released on DVD in the U.S. in November 2002 by 20th Century Fox Home Entertainment.

A Blu-ray edition (including a single-disc edition and a double-disc edition with a DVD copy) was released by First Look Studios on 5 May 2009, available only in the U.S. and Canada.

Due to the low quality of the original Blu-ray transfer, Shout! Factory worked hand in hand with director Neil Marshall to create a brand-new Blu-ray transfer for Dog Soldiers in a release titled Dog Soldiers: Collector's Edition, which was released on 23 June 2015. It was a two-disc set including a brand-new Blu-ray and a DVD copy with a new cover. This edition is only available in the U.S. (Region A). However, the original negative wasn't located at the time of the making of this release, and Shout! Factory had to rely on two original cinema prints, whose visual qualities are limited.

On 14 March 2019, with the original negative finally located, the German company Koch Media released the movie on video in a package including the movie, restored in 4K from the negative, on DVD, Blu-ray and UHD.

Another 4K restoration was announced by Vertigo Releasing in 2020, with a digital release on 12 October 2020 and a limited edition Blu-ray was slated for release by Second Sight Films following in February 2021 but pushed back to August 2022 when access to the negative was gained and fx shots were interposed.

Sequel
Producer David E. Allen said in January 2004 that a sequel, Dog Soldiers: Fresh Meat, would begin a 35-day shoot that April in either Luxembourg or Canada with a budget of $5.5 million. Andy Armstrong, a second-unit director on films including Hellbound: Hellraiser II and Nightbreed, would direct from an Eric Miller script, with Allen and Brian Patrick O’Toole returning as producers. No casting was announced. Allen said the plot would involve Cooper being "picked up by an American team who, we find out, were the real opponents for the war games for Sgt. Wells' squad." A year later, he elaborated that, "In the first film, it was a family who were the werewolves. In this one, it's an actual team of werewolves who are true military men. So even though they are now werewolves, they act like a trained military unit."

In January 2005, Michael J. Bassett was in talks to direct, but by July 2006, Rob Green, who previously directed the horror film The Bunker, was set to direct and said he and Miller had written a story in which "Some of the characters actually love being a werewolf because they are so powerful – the ultimate killing machine … [I]t's a fun spin on the traditional angle that being a werewolf is a curse which damns the person no matter what. We also have a very savage she-wolf in the climax who faces against the leader of the pack of Dog Soldiers." Production was not set for autumn 2006. By 21 December 2008, however, information about the film had been removed from various web resources including the website of production company Kismet.

A "Little Red Riding Hood"-inspired web series, Dog Soldiers: Legacy, was announced in September 2011 by producer and Kismet vice-president, Allen, now going by D. Eric Allen. A teaser trailer for the series was filmed in northwest Arkansas over the last weekend of August 2011. Directed by Ryan Lightbourn, the trailer included members of Allen's family, including his grandmother Pat "Nan" Allen and his sister Emmy Allen, as Red. Allen also said the Dog Soldiers sequel was in early pre-production.

An early poster of Dog Soldiers: Fresh Meat was released with the tagline "Coming 2014" across the bottom on 23 March 2014. D. Eric Allen announced that a prequel and another sequel are in the planning stages, and Fresh Meat would be released on 20 December 2014. This date passed with no release and no additional updates on the film's status.

Neil Marshall stated in an audio commentary for Dog Soldiers, that the moment in the film when Megan cuts her hand on a shard of glass was meant to be a setup for a second sequel about werewolf DNA, which would complete a planned trilogy. However, he added that the planned sequels will "probably amount to nothing now."

See also
 Battle of Rorke's Drift (mentioned in dialogue as an analogy of the squad's situation)

References

Sources

External links

 
 

2002 films
2002 horror films
British werewolf films
2000s English-language films
Films about the Special Air Service
Films directed by Neil Marshall
Films set in 2001
Films set in abandoned houses
Films set in forests
Films set in Scotland
Films shot in Luxembourg
English-language Scottish films
English-language Luxembourgian films
Luxembourgian horror films
Scottish films
Siege films
Syfy original films
2002 directorial debut films
2000s British films